The M. Gweneth Humphreys Award or Humphreys Award is a mathematics award established by the Association for Women in Mathematics in recognition of mathematics educators who have exhibited outstanding mentorship. The award is named for Mabel Gweneth Humphreys (1911-2006) who earned her Ph.D. at age 23 from the University of Chicago in 1935.
She taught mathematics to women for her entire career, first at Mount St. Scholastica College, then for several years at Sophie Newcomb College, and finally for over thirty years at Randolph Macon Woman's College. This award, funded by contributions from her former students and colleagues at Randolph-Macon Woman's College, recognizes her commitment to and her influence on undergraduate students of mathematics.

Recipients 
The following mathematicians have been honored with the Humphreys Award:

See also

 List of mathematics awards

References 

Awards and prizes of the Association for Women in Mathematics